The Conway and Llanrwst Railway was a standard gauge railway built to connect the Welsh coastal town of Conway, nowadays addressed by its Welsh name of Conwy, with the inland towns of Llanrwst and Betws y Coed. It opened in 1863 and was eventually absorbed into the lines operated by the London and North Western Railway. In 2008 it continues to operate as part of the Conwy Valley Line.

History

Proposals
As early as 1846, the Chester and Holyhead Railway (CHR) planned a branch from its mainline at Conway along the Conwy valley to Llanrwst. Although this plan did not result in a railway, in 1853 a proposal for the Conway and Llanrwst Railway was laid before Parliament. This first bill was withdrawn following a proposal for an alternative route from the CHR. A third attempt for a railway along the valley came from the engineer Edmund Sharpe who worked for the CHR. He proposed a narrow gauge line of  gauge along the west side of the valley. This proposal was rejected by the CHR in 1858. Sharpe then joined the promoters of the original Conway and Llanrwst Railway who at a second attempt gained official approval for their railway in July 1860.

Construction
Construction of the railway began in August 1860. By this time the CHR had become part of the London and North Western Railway (LNWR), and the board of the LNWR decided to purchase the Conway and Llanrwst Railway Company and run the railway as a branch of their main line to Holyhead. By 1863 the railway was a part of the LNWR.

Opening
The line opened on 16 June 1863. In July 1865, the LNWR gained a further Act enabling an extension of the line to Betws y Coed, which was then becoming a favoured tourist attraction. This extension was opened in 1868.

The route today
The Conway and Llanrwst Railway continues to operate in 2008, as part of the Conwy Valley Line.

References

Sources 
 

Railway companies established in 1860
Railway lines opened in 1863
Railway companies disestablished in 1863
Standard gauge railways in Wales
Transport in Conwy County Borough